Euepalpus is a genus of parasitic flies in the family Tachinidae. There are at least two described species in Euepalpus.

Species
These two species belong to the genus Euepalpus:
 Euepalpus flavicauda Townsend, 1908
 Euepalpus vestitus (Townsend, 1916)

References

Further reading

 
 
 
 

Tachinidae
Articles created by Qbugbot